The 1967 III FIBA International Christmas Tournament "Trofeo Raimundo Saporta" was the 3rd edition of the FIBA International Christmas Tournament. It took place at Sports City of Real Madrid Pavilion, Madrid, Spain, on 24, 25 and 26 December 1967 with the participations of Real Madrid (champions of the 1966–67 FIBA European Champions Cup), Juventud Kalso (champions of the 1966–67 Liga Española de Baloncesto), Victoria Melbourne and River Plate.

League stage

Day 1, December 24, 1967

|}

Day 2, December 25, 1967

|}

Day 3, December 26, 1967

|}

Final standings

References

1967–68 in European basketball
1967–68 in Spanish basketball